In music, Op. 22 stands for Opus number 22. Compositions that are assigned this number include:

 Arnold – Symphony No. 1
 Barber – Cello Concerto
 Beethoven – Piano Sonata No. 11
 Bizet – Jeux d'enfants
 Chopin – Andante spianato et grande polonaise brillante
 Clara Schumann – Three Romances for Violin and Piano
 Dvořák – Serenade for Strings
 Enescu – String Quartet No. 1
 Enescu – String Quartet No. 2
 Goria – Fantaisie brillante sur des motifs de V. Bellini
 Hindemith – String Quartet No. 4
 Mendelssohn – Capriccio Brillant
 Prokofiev – Visions fugitives
 Rachmaninoff – Variations on a Theme of Chopin
 Rode – 24 Caprices for Violin
 Saint-Saëns – Piano Concerto No. 2
 Sarasate – Spanish Dances, Book II
 Schoenberg – Four Orchestral Songs
 Schumann – Piano Sonata No. 2
 Shostakovich – The Golden Age
 Sibelius – Lemminkäinen Suite
 Tchaikovsky – String Quartet No. 2
 Turina – Danzas fantásticas
 Wieniawski – Violin Concerto No. 2